Andras "Andy" Cziotka (November 11, 1940 – November 19, 2008) was a Hungarian-American soccer midfielder who earned four caps with the U.S. national team in 1965.

Club career
Cziotka spent several years in the German American Soccer League.

National team
In 1965, Cziotka was called up to the U.S. national team for the 1966 FIFA World Cup qualification games.  All four games took place in March.  The first, a 2-2 tie with Mexico took place on March 7.  That was followed by a loss to Mexico, 1-0 win over Honduras and finally a 2-2 tie with Honduras on March 21.  With a 1-2-1 record, the U.S. failed to qualify for the World Cup.

References

External links
 NPSL stats

1940 births
2008 deaths
American soccer players
German-American Soccer League players
Hungarian emigrants to the United States
National Professional Soccer League (1967) players
Philadelphia Spartans players
United States men's international soccer players
Association football defenders